Walker Bleakney (February 8, 1901 – January 15, 1992) was an American physicist, one of inventors of mass spectrometers, and widely noted for his research in the fields of atomic physics, molecular physics, fluid dynamics, the ionization of gases, and blast waves. Bleakney was the chair of the department of physics at Princeton University.
He was the head of the Princeton Ballistic Project during World War II.

Career 
Bleakney graduated from Whitman College in 1924 with a BS degree. He received his Ph.D. from the University of Minnesota in 1930.
He then spent his entire career at Princeton University, first as a National Research Fellow, then as an instructor in 1932.

He then became an assistant professor in 1935 , an associate professor in 1938 and a full professor in 1944.  Bleakney became the  chair of the Department of Physics in 1960, and remained in that capacity until 1967.

Early in his career at Princeton, Bleaker was able to make a difference in nuclear physics. For example, he proved that heavy water contains traces of triple-weight hydrogen (1935). In a team with other Princeton physicists he produced Hydrogen 3 in 1934.

Awards and Distinctions 
 Walker Bleakney was elected to the National Academy of Sciences in 1959
 National Research Council Fellow, 1930–32
 Citations for World War II research
 Honorary D.Sc., Whitman College, 1955
 American Academy of Arts and Sciences, 1963
 Cyrus Fogg Bracket Professor of Physics, Princeton University, 1953
 Class of 1909 Professor of Physics, Princeton University, 1963

References

Further reading 

 R. J. Emrich. Walker Bleakney and the development of the shock tube at Princeton. Shock Wave 5(1996):327–39.

External links 
National Academy of Sciences Biographical Memoir

1901 births
1992 deaths
20th-century American physicists
University of Minnesota alumni
Princeton University faculty
Members of the United States National Academy of Sciences
Mass spectrometrists
Fellows of the American Physical Society